is a Japanese manga series written and illustrated by Toshio Sako. It was serialized in Shueisha's seinen manga magazine Weekly Young Jump from May 2006 to December 2017, with its chapters compiled into forty-nine tankōbon volumes. The manga was later adapted into original video animation, which was released on October 19, 2012.

Plot
Madarame Baku, known as "The Lie Eater", is a gambler who gambles against maniacal opponents. Alongside his protege, Kaji Takaomi, and his bodyguard, Marco, he attempts to take over the underground gambling organization known as Kakerou. Kakerou oversees a variety of high stakes gambles, wherein the participants often use their lives as an ante or a bet. There are 48 members of Kakerou and 101 referees who act as supervisors and the debt collectors for when gambles have been completed. As the series progresses, Baku and his crew find themselves increasingly involved in the war between Kakerou and a rival criminal organization, IDEAL.

Characters

Key Figures

A drifter with an obsession for gambling.

Baku's protege and an emerging gambling talent.

Baku's bodyguard. Marco possesses inhuman strength and a feral split personality known as "Rodem".

Baku's former exclusive Moderator.

An arms dealer. Initially presented as an antagonist, he quickly allies himself with Baku.

Club Kakerou

Leaders

The 21st and current Leader of Kakerou.
Tatsuki Kiruma (切間 撻器, Kiruma Tatsuki) - The 20th Leader of Kakerou. After stepping down he becomes moderator #0.
Kagerounosuke Kiruma (切間 陽炎ノ助, Kiruma Kagerōnosuke) - The first Leader of Kakerou.

Moderators
Tatsuki Kiruma (切間 撻器, Kiruma Tatsuki) - Kakerou Moderator #0, former Leader of Kakerou and father of Souichi.
Souji Makuro (磨黒 燥滋, Makuro Sōji) - Former Kakerou Moderator #0. Kyara took his number and his current one is unknown.
Mitoshi Nowa (能輪 美年, Nowa Mitoshi) - Kakerou Moderator #1 and one of the Leader's Attendants. 

Kakerou Moderator #2 (later #0). Baku's current exclusive Moderator.
Masateru Touya (棟耶 将輝, Masateru Tōya) - Kakerou Moderator #3, as well as one of the Leader's Attendants. Also known as "judge".
Boro Makami (間紙 ボロ, Makami Boro) - Kakerou Moderator #4.
Juuzou Ikon (ヰ近 十蔵, Ikon Jūzō) - Kakerou Moderator #5.
Shion Nowa (能輪 紫音, Nowa Shion) - Kakerou Moderator #6. Son-in-law of Mitoshi, husband of Mirei and father of Mitora Nowa.
Makoto Amen (亜面 真琴, Amen Makoto) - Kakerou Moderator #7.
Mitora Nowa (能輪 巳虎, Nowa Mitora) - Kakerou Moderator #8. Son of Shion and Mirei and grandson of Mitoshi.

Kakerou Moderator #10. Ikki Sadakuni's exclusive Moderator.
Kaoru Bandai (番代 薫, Bandai Kaoru) - Kakerou Moderator #10 (Mekama's successor). Formerly an S-rank sweeper.
Haruaki Douji (銅寺 晴明, Dōji Haruaki) - Kakerou Moderator #11.
Yuudai Kadokura (門倉 雄大, Kadokura Yūdai) - Kakerou Moderator #16 (later #2).
Kyouji Nanpou (南方 恭次, Nanpō Kyōji) - Kakerou Moderator #16 (Kadokura's successor). Assistant commissioner of the Tokyo Metropolitan Police Department.
Mirei Nowa (能輪 美玲, Nowa Mirē) - Kakerou Moderator #22. Daughter of Mitoshi, husband of Shion and mother of Mitora.
Yuusuke Midara (弥鱈 悠助, Midara Yūsuke) - Kakerou Moderator #28.
Takumi Manabe (真鍋 匠, Manabe Takumi) - Kakerou Moderator #29. Former chief of the Private Funeral Division who joins Kakerou after the PDF is dissolved into it.
Hana Mitaka (三鷹 花, Mitaka Hana) - Kakerou Moderator #30 (later #10). Former member of the Private Funeral Division who joins Kakerou after the PDF is dissolved into it.
Watari (亘, Watari) - Kakerou Moderator #35. Satoru Suteguma's exclusive moderator.
Tetsuma Kushinada (櫛灘 鉄馬, Kushinada Tetsuma) - Kakerou Moderator #90.
Taeko Mogami (最上 妙子, Mogami Taeko) - Kakerou Moderator #91. Ranko Kurama's exclusive referee. Also known as "Queen."

Former or Deceased Moderators
Kyara (伽羅, Kyara) - Former Kakerou Moderator #0.
Eba (栄羽, Eba) - Deceased. Former Kakerou Moderator, whose number is unknown. An elderly man who wore a monocle. His public identity was that of a university professor.
Souya Sugita (鷺田 糟谷, Sugita Sōya). Former Kakerou Moderator #25.

Sweepers
Jouichi Yakou (夜行 丈一, Yakō Jōichi) - An S-rank Sweeper and one of Leader's Attendants.
Chris Lee (グリス・李, Gurisu Rī) - An A-rank Sweeper.
Lóng (ロン, Ron) - An A-rank Sweeper.

Misallenous Kakerou Employees
Yuuko Mizue (泉江 夕湖, Mizue Yūko) - Kakerou's Minister of Foreign Affairs.
Chisato Souma (相馬 千聖, Sōma Chisato) - One of Mogami's subordinates.
Nobuo (信男, Nobuo) - Kakerou employee who helps Nobuko escape the island.

Kakerou Members
Tarou Kokonoe (九重 大郎, Kokonoe Tarō) - Primarily known by the moniker "Q-Tarou". His exclusive Moderator is unknown. Marco's abusive adoptive father, owner of the abandoned building and a Kakerou member.

A terrorist and Kakerou member. His exclusive Moderator is Kirou Mekama. Sadakuni becomes involved in Kakerou to fund a terror attack on the Tokyo Stock Exchange. He previously drained the fortunes of five other Kakerou members, two of who had to pay with their lives. He previously fled Japan but later returns.

A senior member of Kakerou and the leader of the Kurama-gumi faction. Her exclusive Moderator is Taeko Mogami.
Kaoru Yukiide (雪井出 薫, Yukīde Kaoru) - A Kakerou member associated with the Metropolitan Police Department. His exclusive Moderator is unknown.
Fukurou (梟, Fukurō) - A former member of Kakerou who became a member again by the time he battled Satoru Suteguma. His exclusive moderator is unknown. An ally of IDEAL, who later becomes a Kakerou Moderator.
Satoru Suteguma (捨隈 悟, Suteguma Satoru) - A Kakerou member who won a membership from Fukurou. His exclusive Moderator is Watari. A member of Ideal, who later joins Kurama-Gumi.

Ideal
Vincent Lalo (ビンセント・ラロ, Binsento Raro) - The leader of the international crime syndicate, IDEAL.
Billy Craig (ビリー・クレイグ, Birī Kurēgu) - A chief member of the international crime syndicate, IDEAL. Nicknamed "Caracal", he is also a diplomat for the United States Embassy in Japan. Vincent's right-hand man.
Satoru Suteguma (捨隈 悟, Suteguma Satoru) - A Kakerou member. His exclusive referee is Watari. A member of Ideal, who later joins Kurama-Gumi. His original name is unknown.
Martin Bruce Whyte (マーティン・ブルース・ホワイト, Mātin Burūsu Howaito) - A member of Ideal.

Vincent's Protoporos Allies
Robert K (ロバートK, Robāto K) - Double-agent working for Ideal. His true purpose for joining Ideal is to find his younger brother. One of the men chosen by Vincent for the Ban match. His exclusive referee during the Ban is Haruaki Douji.
Floyd Lee (フロイド・リー, Furoido Rī) A whistle-blower and wanted criminal. He collaborates with Ideal for his own gain. One of the men chosen by Vincent for the Ban match. His exclusive referee during the Ban is Boro Makami.
Gyeongho Jonglyo (キョンホ ジョンリョ, Kyonho Jonryo) - A bodyguard. One of the people chosen by Vincent for the Ban match. His exclusive referee during the Ban is Kaoru Bandai.
Fukurou (梟, Fukurō) - A gambler who specializes in poker, and was formerly a Kakerou member. One of the people chosen by Vincent for the Ban match. His exclusive referee during the Ban is Shion Nowa.
Bǎi Lóng (百龍, Bai Ron) - A legendary assassin from China. Though retired, he joins the raid on the island after he is told that his wife may be there. One of the Ban Intruders helping Vincent.
Torpe (トルベ, Torube) - One of the Ban Intruders. He has the ability to re-shape his face.
Anoma (アノマ, Anoma) - One of the Ban Intruders. He was requested by Vincent to retrieve his body in case he dies, so it can be turned into a diamond.

Police

Metropolitan Police Department
Sasaoka (笹岡, Sasaoka) -
Seiichi Amako (天真 征一, Amako Sēichi) -
Kyouji Nanpou (南方 恭次, Nanpō Kyōji) - Assistant commissioner of the Tokyo Metropolitan Police Department.
Kaoru Yukiide (雪井出 薫, Yukīde Kaoru) - A Kakerou member associated with the Metropolitan Police Department. His exclusive referee is unknown.
Yukiide's father -
Keisuke Kurisu (栗栖 恵介, Kurisu Kēsuke) -

Private Burial Division
Takumi Manabe (真鍋 匠, Manabe Takumi) - Chief of the Private Burial Division. He joins Kakerou as referee #29 after the PDF is dissolved into it.
Hana Mitaka (三鷹 花, Mitaka Hana) - Member of the Private Burial Division. She joins Kakerou as referee #30 after the PDF is dissolved into it.
Seiichi Minowa (箕輪 勢一, Minowa Sēichi) - Member of the Private Burial Division.
Kouhei Randou (嵐童 公平, Randō Kōhē) - Member of the Private Burial Division and the riot police.

ACIA
Naoki Hachina (蜂名 直器, Hachina Naoki) - Member of the CIRO and the public persona of Souichi Kiruma. 
Makoto Onokami (尾野神 真, Onakami Makoto) - Attorney general, founder of the ACIA and ally of Kakerou. 
Gakuhito Oofuna(大船 額人, Ōfuna Gakuhito) - Member of the Ministry of Defense and one of the people involved in the founding of the ACIA. A very patriotic man who hates corruption.
Yokoi (横井, Yokoi) - Journalist for Asamai Newspaper and one of the people involved in the founding of the ACIA.

Kurama-gumi
Ranko Kuruma (鞍馬 蘭子, Kurama Ranko) - A senior member of Kakerou and the leader of the Kurama-gumi faction. Her exclusive referee is Taeko Mogami. Owner of "Casino Clara."
Leo (レオ, Reo) - Member of Kurama-gumi and one of Ranko's most trusted bodyguards.
Hyougo (雹吾, Hyōgo) - Member of Kurama-gumi and one of Ranko's most trusted bodyguards.

Protoporos associated characters
Richard Arata (リチャード・アラタ, Richādo Arata) - A legendary game designer who created the game Protoporos. The franchise became an international hit that led Arata to become a multi-billionaire. Though he suddenly sold his company and disappeared. 
Richard Arata (リチャード・アラタ, Richādo Arata) - A puppet imitating the real Richard. Leader of the group of outlaws known as the concealers.

Island staff
Hiromi Daiba (台馬 洋海, Daiba Hiromi) - Manager of the Developers. He previously worked at Richard's game company.
Oginome (荻野目, Oginome) - Developer and chief overseer of the Azura kingdom.
Kurashiki (倉敷, Kurashiki) - Developer and chief overseer of the Taper kingdom.
Fujitsubo (藤壺, Fujitsubo) - Developer and chief overseer of the Shoudo kingdom.
Endou (円堂, Endō) - Developer and chief overseer of the neutral area.
Daiguuji (大宮寺, Daigūji) - 
Perpes (ペルペス, Perupesu) - A player hired by the developers to oversee the colosseum.
AAAA (ああああ, AAAA) - A Co-ordinator.
Veronica (ベロニカ, Beronika) - A Single-Task Specialist.
Arahata (荒波田, Arahata) - A Single-Task Specialist.
Abiru (阿比留, Abiru) - A Single-Task Specialist.

Players
Champ (チャンプ, Chanpu) - A slave of Taper. His real name is Takeshi Tsuchiya. Formally the number one player of "Off-Pro". He was invited to the island by the developers. Though starting as a citizen, he was eventually betrayed and had all his belongings taken, forcing him to become a slave.
Ryuusei (りゅうせい, Ryūsē) - A slave of Taper. His real name is Ooyama Nobuo.
Minoru (みのる, Minoru) - A slave of Taper.
Travolta (トラボルタ, Toraboruta) - A slave of Taper.
Pachanga (パチャンガ, Pachanga) - A slave of Taper.
Tobita (トビ太, Tobita) - A slave of Taper.
Menma (メンマ, Menma) - A slave of Taper.
Tsuneo (つね男, Tsuneo) - A formal ally of Champ who betrayed him and stole all his belongings. Currently works as one of the "Untouchables" for the "Untouchable Line" game.
Nobuko (のぶ子, Nobuko) - A high class player from Shoudo. She eventually becomes the king of Shoudo.
Cameo (カメオ, Kameo) - A priest of Taper.
NeroNero (ネロネロ, Neronero) - The king of Taper.

Media

Manga
Usogui is written and illustrated by Toshio Sako. It was serialized in Shueisha's Weekly Young Jump from May 11, 2006 to December 21, 2017. Shueisha compiled its 594 chapters into forty-nine tankōbon volumes, released from September 19, 2006 to February 19, 2018. A spin-off manga titled Usogui: Tokubetsu-hen was serialized in Weekly Young Jump from October 7, 2021 to November 25, 2021, with its one compiled volume releasing in February 2022.

Volume list
1 (September 19, 2006)
2 (December 19, 2006)
3 (March 19, 2007)
4 (June 19, 2007)
5 (September 19, 2007)
6 (December 19, 2007)
7 (March 19, 2008)
8 (June 19, 2008)
9 (September 19, 2008)
10 (December 19, 2008)
11 (March 19, 2009)
12 (June 19, 2009)
13 (September 18, 2009)
14 (December 18, 2009)
15 (December 18, 2009)
16 (March 19, 2010)
17 (June 18, 2010)
18 (September 17, 2010)
19 (December 17, 2010)
20 (March 18, 2011)
21 (June 17, 2011)
22 (September 16, 2011)
23 (December 19, 2011)
24 (March 19, 2012)
25 (June 19, 2012)
26 (October 19, 2012)
27 (November 19, 2012)
28 (February 19, 2013)
29 (May 17, 2013)
30 (August 19, 2013)
31 (November 19, 2013)
32 (February 19, 2014)
33 (May 19, 2014)
34 (August 20, 2014)
35 (November 19, 2014)
36 (February 19, 2015)
37 (May 19, 2015)
38 (May 19, 2015)
39 (September 18, 2015)
40 (December 18, 2015)
41 (April 19, 2016)
42 (June 17, 2016)
43 (September 16, 2016)
44 (December 19, 2016)
45 (March 17, 2017)
46 (June 19, 2017)
47 (August 18, 2017)
48 (November 17, 2017)
49 (February 19, 2018)

Live-action film
A live action film adaptation was announced in the 24th issue of Shueisha's Weekly Young Jump magazine in 2016. The film is produced by Warner Bros. Japan and directed by Hideo Nakata. The film was released in Japan on February 11, 2022.

Reception
The manga's compiled book volumes have frequently ranked on Oricon's weekly top 50 comic charts. Volume 10 reached number 28, Volume 11 reached number 16, Volume 12 reached number 19, Volume 13 reached number 29, Volume 14 reached number 20, Volume 16 reached number 19, Volume 17 reached number 21, Volume 18 reached number 18, Volume 19 reached number 27, Volume 20 reached number 25.

See also
Gambling in Japan

References

External links
 Official website 
 

Anime and manga about gambling
Manga adapted into films
Manga series
Seinen manga
Shueisha franchises
Shueisha manga